Acrocercops goniodesma is a moth of the family Gracillariidae, known from Java, Indonesia. It was described by Edward Meyrick in 1934. The larvae feed on a Magnoliaceae species.

References

goniodesma
Moths of Asia
Moths described in 1934